Mehdi Puch-Herrantz (born 20 January 2004) is a professional footballer who plays as a defensive midfielder for Ajaccio. Born in France, he is a youth international for Algeria.

Career
Puch-Herrantz is a youth product of Sevran FC, FC Villepinte, Torcy and Montfermeil, before moving to the reserves of AC Ajaccio in 2021. On 25 August 2022, he signed a professional contract with the club for 5 years. He made his professional debut with Ajaccio as a late substitute in a 3–0 Ligue 1 loss to Nice on 10 February 2023.

International career
Born in France, Puch-Herrantz is of Algerian descent. He represented the Algeria U18s at the 2022 Mediterranean Games. He scored the game-winning goal from outside the box in a 1–0 win over the Spain U18s in the side's first match in the tournament.

References

External links
 
 Ligue 1 profile

2004 births
Living people
Footballers from Paris
Algerian footballers
Algeria youth international footballers
French footballers
French sportspeople of Algerian descent
AC Ajaccio players
Ligue 1 players
Championnat National 3 players
Association football midfielders